The men's heavyweight (+80 kilograms) event at the 2018 Asian Games took place on 21 August 2018 at Jakarta Convention Center Plenary Hall, Jakarta, Indonesia.

A total of fifteen competitors from fifteen countries competed in this event, limited to fighters whose body weight was more than 80 kilograms. 

Saeid Rajabi from Iran won the gold medal after defeating the former world champion Dmitriy Shokin from Uzbekistan in the gold medal match in the golden round by the score of 3–2. Dmitriy Shokin was also a silver medalist from the previous edition in Incheon, South Korea.

Rajabi won Iran's first ever gold medal in this heavyweight event at the history of the Asian Games.

The bronze medal was shared by semifinal losers (without having a third place match) Hamza Kattan of Jordan and Ruslan Zhaparov from Kazakhstan.

Schedule
All times are Western Indonesia Time (UTC+07:00)

Results

References

External links
Official website

Taekwondo at the 2018 Asian Games